Margo Smith is a self-titled re-recorded studio album by American country music artist Margo Smith. It was released in 1986 in conjunction with Dot Records and MCA Records. The project was Smith's second eponymous release and contained ten tracks of material. While all the material was newly recorded, the songs chosen for the album were re-recordings of music Smith first cut during the 1970s.

Background, content and release
During the late 1970s, Margo Smith had several major country hits with songs like "Don't Break the Heart That Loves You," "It Only Hurts for a Little While" and "Little Things Mean a Lot". After making several changes to wardrobe and musical appearance, Smith went into different stylistic directions during the 1980s and had less commercial success. She continued releasing music to several different labels. In 1985, MCA Records announced a plan to reactivate and take control of Dot Records. With the new label, MCA also announced they would record and release new music by several veteran country artists. The albums were set for release between 1985 and 1986. Smith was among the artists chosen for the new joint venture. She began recording for the project during the fall of 1985 at Studio 19, located in Nashville, Tennessee. The sessions were produced by Al Henson.

The eponymous release contained a total of ten tracks. The project were ten newly re-recorded versions of songs previously cut by Smith while at 20th Century Fox and Warner Bros. labels respectively. Included were re-recordings of Smith's two number one singles from 1978: "Don't Break the Heart That Loves You" and "It Only Hurts for a Little While". Also included were re-recordings of the top ten hits "Still a Woman," "There I Said It," "Save Your Kisses for Me" and "Little Things Mean a Lot". The album was released in 1986 via Dot and MCA Records. It was issued as a vinyl LP and as a cassette with similar track listings.

Track listing

Personnel
All credits are adapted from the liner notes of Margo Smith.

Musical and technical personnel
 Clyde Brooks – Drums
 Sonny Garrish – Steel guitar
 Al Henson – Producer
 Hoot Hester – Fiddle
 Roger Morris – Keyboards
 Gary Prim – Keyboards
 Jack Ross – Bass
 Ronny Scaife – Rhythm guitar
 Dale Sellers – Lead guitar
 Margo Smith – Lead vocals
 Bruce Watkins – Rhythm guitar

Release history

References

1986 albums
Dot Records albums
MCA Records albums
Margo Smith albums